Mahmud Shevket Pasha (1856 – 11 June 1913) was an Ottoman generalissimo and statesman, who was an important political figure during the Second Constitutional Era. During the 31 March Incident, Shevket Pasha and the Committee of Union and Progress overthrew Abdul Hamid II after an anti-Constitutionalist uprising in Constantinople (modern Istanbul). He played the role of a power broker after the crisis, balancing the various factions of the Young Turks and the army. As War Minister he played a leading role in military reform and the establishment of the Ottoman Air Force. Shevket Pasha became Grand Vizier during the First Balkan War in the aftermath of the 1913 coup d'état, from 23 January 1913 until his death by assassination.

Early life and career 
Mahmud Shevket was born in Baghdad in 1856. His grandfather, Hacı Talib Ağa had moved from Tbilisi to Baghdad. His father was Basra governor Kethüdazade Süleyman Faik Bey. He had four brothers, Numan, Murad, Khaled, and the much younger Hikmet, the latter two would become important statesmen of post Ottoman rule Iraq. Raised as an Ottoman, most sources claim that he had Georgian, Chechen, or Iraqi Arab ancestry. However, according to the memories of Turkey's third president Celal Bayar and also Turkish politician Rıza Tevfik Bölükbaşı, the relatives of the pasha declared to them that they were of Georgian origin. In addition to Ottoman Turkish and Arabic, he spoke French and German. 

He finished his primary education in Baghdad before going on to the Military Academy (Ottoman Turkish: Mekteb-i Harbiye) in Constantinople (now Istanbul). Mahmud Shevket joined the army in 1882 as a lieutenant and rose through the ranks, eventually achieving the rank of Ferik (Lieutenant General) by 1901. He spent some time in France investigating military technology and was briefly stationed in Crete. He then returned to the Military Academy as a faculty member. He worked under Colmar Freiherr von der Goltz for a while and traveled to Germany. In 1905 Mahmud Shevket was appointed governor of the Kosovo Vilayet, during the height of the Macedonian Conflict.

31 March Incident 

The Committee of Union and Progress (CUP) prevailed in the 1908 Young Turk Revolution, which forced the sultan Abdul Hamid II to reinstate the Ottoman constitution and call for elections. Mahmud Shevket Pasha was placed in command of the Selanik (Thessaloniki) based Third Army after the revolution. A year later saw the 31 March Incident, when counter-revolutionary reactionaries rose up in support of Abdulhamid's absolutist rule and the Constitution was once again repealed. The CUP appealed to Shevket Pasha to restore the status quo, and he organized the Action Army, an ad hoc formation made up of his Third Army and elements of the First and Second Armies to suppress the uprising. His chief of staff during the crisis was the first president of the Republic of Turkey, captain Mustafa Kemal (Atatürk). The Action Army entered Constantinople (Istanbul) on 24 April, and after a series of negotiations, Abdulhamid II was deposed, Mehmed V Reshad ascended to the throne, the Constitution was reinstated for the third and last time, and the CUP was allowed to form a government. Thus started his complex and tenuous relationship with the "Sacred Committee".

War Minister 
After the incident, he became an important power holder in Ottoman politics: Shevket Pasha was made Martial-law Commander of Constantinople, inspector of the First, Second, and Third Armies, a senator, and Minister of War. Though Hüseyin Hilmi Pasha came back to form a government, his premiership was widely seen as being under Shevket Pasha's control. His tenourship as War Minister saw the suppression of the 1910 Albanian Revolt. He also used troops from Tripolitania to suppress Yahya Muhammad Hamid ed-Din's revolt in Yemen, which exposed Tripolitania to foreign invasion from Italy in 1911.

Shevket Pasha is credited for the creation of the Ottoman Air Force in 1911. Shevket Pasha gave much importance to a military aviation program and as a result the Ottoman Air Force became one of the pioneering aviation institutions in the world. 

Though he saved the CUP in the 31 March Incident, Shevket Pasha also played a pivotal role in the 1912 coup which caused the fall of the CUP government. His resignation as War Minister was an effective endorsement to the Savior Officers, who were able to maneuver around the Unionist parliament and shuttered it, driving them underground.

Premiership and assassination 

During the First Balkan War, the Ottoman Empire lost all of its Balkan possessions except the outskirts of Constantinople. The CUP overthrew Kâmil Pasha's Savior Officer backed government in January 1913 in a coup known as the Raid on the Sublime Porte, because he entered negotiations with the Balkan League. In a move seen as a compromise by the CUP, Union and Progress entered cabinet again, while Shevket Pasha was made Grand Vizier, War Minister, and Foreign Minister and resumed fighting in the war. However the change in government did not change the reality that the war and most of Rumelia was lost. The Treaty of London ended the First Balkan War, though Shevket Pasha's government never signed the treaty. The Ottoman Empire would recover Eastern Thrace and Edirne in the Second Balkan War, but by then Shevket Pasha would be dead. 

On 11 June 1913 Mahmud Shevket Pasha was assassinated in his car in Beyazit Square in a revenge attack by a relative of the assassinated War Minister Nazım Pasha, who was killed during the 1913 coup. He was buried in the Monument of Liberty, dedicated to soldiers of the Action Army who were killed in the 31 March Incident. The car he was in, the uniform he was wearing, the clothes of his murdered aides, and the weapons used in the assassination are all on display at the Istanbul Military Museum. 

On the day of his assassination, a deputy of the Freedom and Accord Party, Lütfi Fikri stated "In the full sense of the word, Mahmud Şevket Pasha has committed suicide, and this was decided on the day he accepted the grand vezierate over the corpse of Nâzım Pasha. I am sure that this man did not like, for instance, Talaat Bey and his friends. How could it be that he became, to such a degree, a toy in their hands and died for this reason?"

Legacy 

Mahmud Shevket Pasha represented the last independent personality in the Empire's politics; the successor of the premiership, Said Halim Pasha, would be a puppet of the CUP's radical faction, headed by the triumvirate of Talat, Enver, and Cemal, all of whom would finally enter the cabinet following his death. Enver took Shevket Pasha's old post of Minister of War by 1914, and Talat in addition to returning to the interior ministry after his assassination, himself became Grand Vizier in 1917. Shevket Pasha's assassination allowed the CUP, primarily Talat Pasha, to establish a radically Turkish nationalist dictatorship that would last until the Ottoman Empire's defeat in World War I in 1918. This dictatorship would see the empire retake Edirne in the Second Balkan War, but also join and lose World War I while committing genocide against its Christian minorities.

Shevket Pasha was the last Ottoman Grand Vizier to die in office.

A town in Beykoz, Istanbul is named after him. The name of the town Tirilye was changed to Mahmutşevketpaşa in his memory after his assassination, but would rename itself to Zeytinbağı in 1963.

Shevket Pasha's speech to the Action Army  
In a 2012 interview with Habertürk, Murat Bardakçı publicized what he claimed was the first ever sound recording made in the Ottoman Empire, which was Mahmud Shevket Pasha's rallying speech to the troops of the Action Army, urging them to march on Istanbul and overthrow the sultan. While a YouTube video recording of the speech has gone viral, its veracity has been controversial. A study by the historian Derya Tulga concluded that it is impossible for an original audio recording of Shevket Pasha's 1909 speech to exist, and even assuming it is Mahmud Shevket Pasha's voice, the recording was ultimately a reenactment produced two years after the 31 March Incident, which he would have done for propaganda purposes. She goes further to state that the voice in the recording is most likely not even Shevket Pasha's but instead the Turkish representative of Favorite Platten Record Company Ahmet Şükrü Bey. Mehmet Çalışkan came to a similar conclusion, adding that the words of the speech itself can't be verified to be Shevket Pasha's, and points out that Ahmet Şükrü promoted the voice recording on a 15 August 1911 issue of the CUP mouthpiece Tanin.

Works 
Shevket Pasha wrote several books in addition to his memoirs. He also translated Alphonse Karr's Sous les Tilleuls.
 Logaritma Cedâvili Risalesi (from Jean Dupuis, H. 1301)
 Fenn-i Esliha (H. 1301)
 Usûl-i Hendese I-II (H. 1302-1304)
 Asâkir-i Şahanenin Piyade Sınıfına Mahsus 87 Modeli Mükerrer Ateşli Mavzer üzer Tüfeği (H. 1303)
 Mükerrer Ateşli Tüfekler (H.1308), Küçük Çaplı Mavzer Tüfekleri Risâlesi (H. 1311)
 Küçük Çaplı Mavzer Tüfeklerine Mahsus Atlas  (H.1311)
 Devlet-i Osmâniyye’nin Bidâyet-i Tesisinden Şimdiye Kadar Osmanlı Teşkilât ve Kıyâfet-i Askeriyesi” (I-III, H. 1320)

Gallery

References

Sources 
 (Google Books)

External links
 
 Alleged recording of Mahmud Shevket Pasha's speech to the Action Army

1856 births
1913 deaths
People from Baghdad
Iraqi people of Georgian descent
Georgians from the Ottoman Empire
Ottoman Military Academy alumni
Ottoman Military College alumni
Pashas
Field marshals of the Ottoman Empire
20th-century Grand Viziers of the Ottoman Empire
Ottoman people of the Balkan Wars
Assassinated people from the Ottoman Empire